Hammamet or El Hammamet is a town and commune in Algiers Province, Algeria. In 1998 the commune had a total population of 15,879.

Notable people

See also

Communes of Algeria

References

Communes of Algiers Province
Towns in Algeria
Algiers Province